Wamanripayuq (Quechua wamanripa Senecio, -yuq a suffix, "the one with the wamanripa", also spelled Huamanripayoc) is a mountain in the Andes of Peru which reaches an altitude of approximately . It is located in the Lima Region, Huarochirí Province, Carampoma District. Wamanripayuq lies east of Awqa Pallqa.

References

Mountains of Peru
Mountains of Lima Region